Red Flower Rising is a public artwork by American artist Richard Taylor located outside the Milwaukee Public Market, on the corner of Broadway Street and East St. Paul Avenue in the Historic Third Ward in downtown Milwaukee, Wisconsin. The red painted aluminum sculpture was installed in 2007 in memory of Jeffry A. Posner.

See also
A Beam of Sun to Shake the Sky
All in the Air at Once
You Rise Above the World

References

Outdoor sculptures in Milwaukee
2007 sculptures
Aluminum sculptures in Wisconsin
2007 establishments in Wisconsin